The 2004–05 Segunda Divisão season was the 71st season of the competition and the 55th season of recognised third-tier football in Portugal.

Overview
The league was contested by 59 teams in 3 divisions with SC Covilhã, FC Vizela and FC Barreirense winning the respective divisional competitions and gaining promotion to the Liga de Honra.  The overall championship was won by FC Vizela.

League standings

Segunda Divisão – Zona Norte

Segunda Divisão – Zona Centro

CD Alcains  Withdrew

Segunda Divisão – Zona Sul

Footnotes

External links
 Portuguese Division Two «B» – footballzz.co.uk

Portuguese Second Division seasons
Port
3